Satyadharma Tirtha (c. 1743 – c. 1830), was a Hindu philosopher, scholar, theologian and saint belonging to the Dvaita order of Vedanta. He was the 28th pontiff of Uttaradi Math since Madhvacharya from 1797-1830.

Life
Satyadharma Tirtha was born in 1743 in Savanur, Haveri district, Karnataka. His purvashrama name was Navaratna Purushottamacharya. He belongs to Navaratna family of scholars, who belongs to Deshastha Madhwa Brahmin family. Satyadharma Tirtha was a contemporary and guru of Dewan Purnaiah.

Works

There have been 27 works accredited to Satyadharma Tirtha,  10 of which are commentaries on the works of Hindu philosopher's of Dvaita order, especially Jayatirtha.

Miscellaneous works:
Kavikanthamani
Yaduvaracharitamruta Lahari
Bhagavadbhajanam
Hitopadesha
Sri Rangeshwara Srungaralahari
Geetamahatmyasarasangraha
Antrlapikah
Barirlapikah
Gurvashtakam

References

Bibliography

External links
Satyadharma Tirtha Biography - uttaradimath.org

Madhva religious leaders
19th-century Indian philosophers
Indian Hindu saints
Dvaitin philosophers
Uttaradi Math
Scholars from Karnataka
History of Karnataka
1743 births
1830 deaths
Madhva Brahmins